The Israel Science Foundation (ISF) is a nonprofit organization that provides monetary grants for scientific research in Israel. It is the Israeli analogue of scientific funding bodies in other countries such as the US National Science Foundation or the Canadian Natural Sciences and Engineering Research Council. It is administered by the Israel Academy of Sciences and Humanities. Its annual budget is 142 million USD. The majority of ISF funding comes from the Government of Israel. The foundation was created in 1972 as the Branch for Basic Research and assumed its present name in 1991. From 2002 to 2009, Joseph Klafter chaired the foundation.

References

External links
 Official website

Scientific research foundations